is a Japanese astronomer. He operates a small private observatory, Hadano Astronomical Observatory, located about 60 km southwest of Tokyo. It is mainly used for astrometric observations of comets and minor planets. Asami is also a member of the Japan Spaceguard Association (JSGA).

References

External links 
 Hadano Astronomical Observatory

Discoverers of asteroids

20th-century Japanese astronomers
Living people
Year of birth missing (living people)